is a Japanese manga series written and illustrated by Natsuki Takaya. It was originally serialized in Hakusensha's shōjo manga magazine Hana to Yume Planet Zōkan from April 1994 to September 1997, with its chapters collected in five tankōbon volumes. The series follows Tamaki Otoya, an ancient summoner, as he battles to protect humanity from evil while also pursuing a romance with his childhood friend Asahi.

Plot

Characters

Media
Written by Natsuki Takaya, Phantom Dream was first serialized in Hana to Yume Planet Zōkan from April 15, 1994 to September 30, 1997. The 15 individual chapters were later compiled and published in five tankōbon volumes by Hakusensha. The first volume was released on February 19, 1996, with the final volume released December 12, 1997.

Chuang Yi licensed the series for English-language publication in Singapore, with all 5 volumes released as of May 2009. These volumes are being re-released in Australia and New Zealand by Madman Entertainment with the final volume released as of June 10, 2009. Tokyopop has licensed the series for English-language publication in North America, with the first volume due for release in December 2008.

The series is also licensed for a regional language release in French by Delcourt.

Manga

Reception
Publishers Weekly wrote that Phantom Dream would appeal to fans of Takaya and Fruits Basket. According to the reviewer, the plot was "generally predictable" and lacked depth, and the character designs were typical of her work.

References

External links
 
  at Pop Culture Shock 
   at Pop Culture Shock 
 Vol. 1 review  at About.com
 Vol. 1 review from Comic Book Bin

1994 manga
Dark fantasy anime and manga
Hakusensha manga
Natsuki Takaya
Romance anime and manga
Shōjo manga
Tokyopop titles